Lucien Smith (born 1989, Los Angeles) is an American artist and filmmaker based in New York. Forbes featured Smith twice in its 2013 and 2014 list of 30 under 30 in the category "Art & Style". The New York Times named him the "art world Wunderkind".

Education 
Smith graduated with a BFA from the Cooper Union School of Art in 2011.

Art market 
Artsy estimated in 2014 that Smith generated a total of $3.7 million at auction that year.

Smith is associated with other young painters such Oscar Murillo and Jacob Kassay whose work has appreciated rapidly and are favored by collectors for investment-ready fare. A work from Smith's 2011 Cooper Union graduate show was resold in November 2013 for $389,000. In February 2014, his work Two Sides of the Same Coin sold for £224,500 at a Sotheby's auction in London.

Serving the People 
In 2017, Smith launched the Serving the People (STP) an organization building the future of creativity, collaboration, and communication. Guided by a network of creatives and technologists, STP aims to rebuild the infrastructure for cultural participation.

Artworks

Rain Paintings 
In 2011, Smith executed a suite of abstractions he calls Rain Paintings, which he creates by spraying fire extinguishers filled with paint. In 2014 an example of these works titled Two Sides of the Same Coin sold at Sotheby's Contemporary Art Evening Auction London's first lot for $372,000 against an estimate of $66,000–99,000.

Tigris Paintings 

In 2014, Smith produced Tigris, a show of 11 camouflage-patterned abstract paintings, inspired by the recollection of the first work of art that strongly impacted him—Hokusai's The Great Wave off Kanagawa. The exhibit was described as "undistinguished" and "a shrewd career move".

Exhibitions

Solo exhibitions
 Lucien Smith Curated by Bill Powers, Half Gallery, Paris, France, 2019
 Tulips!, The Fireplace Project, Amagansett, New York, 2018
 "Friends", Empty Gallery, New York, 2018
 Cosmas & Damian, Moran Bondaroff, Los Angeles, 2017
 Ship of Fools, Appointment Only, Los Angeles, 2017
 Allergic to Morning, Moran Bondaroff, Los Angeles, 2016
 Vicious Cycles, Surf Lodge, Montauk, 2016
 Tigris, Skarstedt Gallery, New York, 2014
 Nature is my Church, Salon 94, New York, 2013
 Scrap Metal, Bill Brady / KC, Kansas City, 2013
 A Clean Sweep, Suzanne Geiss, Co., New York, 2013
 Good Vibrations, Half Gallery, New York, 2012
 Seven Rain Paintings, OHWOW Gallery, Los Angeles, 2012
 Needle in the Hay and Cripple Creek, Ritter-Zamet, London, 2011
 Imagined Nostalgia, Cooper Union, New York, 2011.

Group exhibitions
 The Smiths, Marlborough Gallery, London, 2019
 MIDTOWN, curated by Jeanne Greenberg and Michele Maccarone, Lever House, New York, 2017
 Intimate Paintings, Half Gallery, New York, 2015
 Matters of Pattern, Skarstedt, New York, 2015
 Prospect New Orleans, curated by Franklin Sirmans, Contemporary Arts Center New Orleans, 2014
 Next, Arsenal, Montréal, Canada, 2014
 ANAMERICANA, curated by Vincenzo de Bellis, American Academy in Rome, Rome, 2013
 The Writing is on the Wall, Jonathan Viner, London, 2013
 Sunsets and Pussy, with Ed Ruscha, Betty Tompkins and Piotr Uklanksi, Marianne Boesky, New York, 2013
 Merci Mercy, curated by Christine Messineo, 980 Madison Avenue, New York, 2013
 Beyond the Object, Brand New Gallery, Milan, 2013
 It Ain't Fair 2012, OHWOW Gallery, Miami Beach, 2012
 Homebody, The Stillhouse Group, Brooklyn, 2011
 It Ain't Fair: Materialism, OHWOW Gallery, Miami, 2011
 Objects that Love You Back, curated by Grear Patterson, Stillhouse, New York, 2010
 It Ain't Fair 2010, OHWOW Gallery, Miami, 2010
 New Deal, curated by Kyle Thurman and Matt Moravec, Art Production Fund Gallery, New York, 2009
 May Flowers, curated by Scott Keightley, New York, 2009
 I want a little sugar in my bowl, curated by Terence Koh, ASS Gallery, New York, 2009
 Stillhouse, Seven Eleven Gallery, New York, 2009.

References

External links 
 Artist Studio website
 Now Recalling | 'Imagined Nostalgia, T Magazine.
 The New Deal: Just What the Art Market Needed
 Lucien Smith Refocuses On Art Amid the Spectacle, T Magazine.
  Lucien Smith: A Fresh-Faced Kid, Taking on Mortality, The New York Times.
 Emerging Art Cools Down, The New York Times.
 A Wunderkind Artist Summons a Barely Bygone New York, T Magazine.

1989 births
Living people
American contemporary artists